Any Mother Doesn't Grumble is an LP released in 1972 by Mick Softley, produced by  
Tony Cox under the CBS record label in the UK and the Netherlands, and the Epic record label in Japan. It was reissued on CD by Cherry Red Records in November 2016. The cover art work is by Ian Beck.

Track listing 
 Song That I Sing
 Hello, Little Flower	
 Sing While You Can	
 Minstrel Song	
 Magdalene´s Song	
 Traveller´s Song	
 From The Land Of The Grab
 Lady Willow	
 Great Wall Of Cathay	
 If Wishes Were Horses	
 Have You Ever Really Seen	
 I´m So Confused

References 

 Arcor Website

Mick Softley albums
1972 albums